Tuyyq (Tūiyq, تۇيىق), also known as Tuyuk,  is a town in Almaty Region, southeast Kazakhstan.

References

Populated places in Almaty Region
Cities and towns in Kazakhstan